The R212 road is a regional road in Ireland which links Cavan in County Cavan with Clones in County Monaghan. The road passes through the villages of Pullamore, Drumherrish, Regaskin, Ballyhaise and Scotshouse.

See also 

 Roads in Ireland
 National primary road
 National secondary road

References 

Regional roads in the Republic of Ireland

Roads in County Monaghan
Roads in County Cavan